Halysidota is a genus of moths in the family Erebidae. The genus was erected by Jacob Hübner in 1819.

Species
 Halysidota ata Watson, 1980
 Halysidota atra Druce, 1884
 Halysidota baritioides Rothschild, 1909
 Halysidota brasiliensis Rothschild, 1909
 Halysidota cinctipes Grote, 1865 – Florida tussock moth
 Halysidota conflua Watson, 1980
 Halysidota davisii H. Edwards, 1874 – Davis' tussock moth
 Halysidota donahuei Watson, 1980
 Halysidota elota (Möschler, 1886)
 Halysidota eudolobata Hampson, 1901
 Halysidota fuliginosa Rothschild, 1909
 Halysidota fumosa Schaus, 1912
 Halysidota grata Walker, 1866
 Halysidota harrisii Walsh, 1864 – sycamore tussock moth
 Halysidota instabilis Dyar, 1912
 Halysidota insularis Rothschild, 1909
 Halysidota intensa Rothschild, 1909
 Halysidota interlineata Walker, 1855
 Halysidota interstriata (Hampson, 1901)
 Halysidota leda (Druce, 1890)
 Halysidota masoni (Schaus, 1895)
 Halysidota meridionalis Rothschild, 1909
 Halysidota nigrilinea Watson, 1980
 Halysidota orientalis Rothschild, 1909
 Halysidota pearsoni Watson, 1980
 Halysidota pectenella Watson, 1980
 Halysidota rhoda (Hampson, 1901)
 Halysidota roseofasciata (Druce, 1906)
 Halysidota rusca (Schaus, 1896)
 Halysidota ruscheweyhi Dyar, 1912
 Halysidota schausi Rothschild, 1909 – Schaus' tussock moth
 Halysidota semibrunnea (Druce, 1906)
 Halysidota steinbachi Rothschild, 1909
 Halysidota striata E. D. Jones, 1908
 Halysidota tessellaris Smith, 1797 – pale tiger moth
 Halysidota torniplaga Reich, 1935
 Halysidota tucumanicola Strand, 1919
 Halysidota underwoodi Rothschild, 1909
 Halysidota yapacaniae Watson, 1980

Former species
 Halysidota anapheoides Rothschild, 1909
 Halysidota grandis (Rothschild, 1909)
 Halysidota humosa (Dognin, 1893)
 Halysidota melaleuca (Felder, 1874)
 Halysidota mexiconis Strand, 1919
 Halysidota triphylia (Druce, 1896)

References

 
Phaegopterina
Moth genera